A rattler is a member in a group of venomous snakes.

Rattler or rattlers may also refer to:

Arts and entertainment
 Rattler (comics), a fictional character from the Marvel Comics Universe
 Rattler (periodical), published by the Bus Preservation Society of Western Australia
 Rattlers (film), a 1976 horror film
 "The Rattler", a song by Scottish rock band Goodbye Mr. Mackenzie
 Iron Rattler, a wooden roller coaster at Six Flags Fiesta Texas in San Antonio, Texas formerly known as The Rattler

Sports
 Arizona Rattlers, a professional indoor football team based in Phoenix, Arizona
 Dallas Rattlers, a Major League Lacrosse team based in Dallas, Texas
 Florida A&M Rattlers and Lady Rattlers, the sports teams of Florida A&M University
 Bradford Rattlers, a Canadian Junior ice hockey team based out of Bradford, Ontario
 St. Mary's Rattlers, the sports teams of St. Mary's University, Texas

People
 Spencer Rattler (born 2000), an American football quarterback for the South Carolina Gamecocks

Other uses
 HMS Rattler, several vessels of the Royal Navy